Streatham South ward is an administrative division of the London Borough of Lambeth, United Kingdom. It is the most southerly ward of the borough and has borders with Croydon, Merton, and Wandsworth. The population of the ward at the 2011 Census was 14,336.  The ward includes the neighbourhoods of:
 Streatham Vale (south-west of Streatham Common railway station); 
 Lower Streatham (west of Streatham High Road and south of Greyhound Lane); 
 Streatham Lodge Estate conservation area (east of Streatham High Road and south of the Streatham Common open space).

Streatham South ward is located in the Streatham constituency of the UK House of Commons, the Lambeth and Southwark constituency of the London Assembly, and was in the London constituency of the European Parliament.

Lambeth Council elections
At the Lambeth Council elections, 2010 residents of Streatham South ward elected three Labour Party Councillors: Mark Bennett, David Malley, and John Kazantzis. Turnout was 59%. Bennett became Mayor of Lambeth in March 2013, but died in February 2014, his seat remaining vacant. All three seats are up for election at the next Lambeth Council elections, on 22 May 2014, the same day as other United Kingdom local elections and the European Parliament elections in the United Kingdom.

Lambeth Council elections 2018 
The 2018 Lambeth council elections took place on Thursday May 3, 2018 to elect 3 councillors.

References

External links
Lambeth Borough Council profile for the ward
Streatham South election results on Lambeth website
 Statement of persons nominated for the 2014 election of Councillors for Streatham South

Wards of the London Borough of Lambeth